Schönebeck (Elbe) is a former Verwaltungsgemeinschaft ("collective municipality") in the Salzlandkreis district, in Saxony-Anhalt, Germany. The seat of the Verwaltungsgemeinschaft was in Schönebeck. It was disbanded in January 2009.

The Verwaltungsgemeinschaft Schönebeck (Elbe) consisted of the following municipalities:

 Plötzky 
 Pretzien 
 Ranies 
 Schönebeck

Former Verwaltungsgemeinschaften in Saxony-Anhalt